Mion is a Block and village panchayat in Budaun district, Uttar Pradesh, India. 0186 is the block number of Mion. There are 115 Villages under Mion block. According to 2011 Census of India, total population is 157657 out of 84983 are males and are 72674 females.

References 

Villages in Budaun district
Blocks in Budaun District